Lasthenia coronaria is a species of flowering plant in the family Asteraceae known by the common name royal goldfields. It is native to California and Baja California, including Guadalupe Island.

Description
Lasthenia coronaria is an annual herb approaching a maximum height near 40 centimeters. The stem may be branched or not and it bears linear or deeply divided, pointed leaves up to about 6 centimeters long. The leaves, and sometimes the stems, have a coat of glandular hairs. The foliage has a sweet scent.

Atop the stems are inflorescences of flower heads with hairy, glandular phyllaries. The head contains many yellow disc florets with a fringe of small yellow ray florets.

The fruit is a hairy achene up to about 2 millimeters long.

External links

Jepson Manual Treatment: Lasthenia coronaria
USDA Plants Profile
Lasthenia coronaria — U.C. Photo gallery

coronaria
Flora of California
Flora of Baja California
Flora of Mexican Pacific Islands
Flora without expected TNC conservation status